United Nations Security Council Resolution 273, adopted on December 9, 1969, after a complaint from Senegal regarding the shelling of the Senegalese village of Samine from a Portuguese base in Begene, the Council condemned the action and called upon Portugal to desist from violating the sovereignty and territorial integrity of Senegal.

The resolution was adopted by 13 votes to none; Spain and the United States abstained.

See also
 List of United Nations Security Council Resolutions 201 to 300 (1965–1971)

References 
Text of the Resolution at undocs.org

External links
 

 0273
20th century in Portugal
 0273
 0273
 0273
Portuguese Guinea
December 1969 events